People with the surname Parrington include:

Francis Rex Parrington (1905-1981), British palaeontologist
Gareth Parrington, child actor
Samantha Parrington, fictional superhero Valkyrie (Marvel Comics)
Vernon Louis Parrington (1871-1929), American literary historian
William Parrington (1889-1980), English cricketer